Sydney Blomquist (born August 31, 1993) is an American professional soccer player from Bel Air, Maryland. She plays for Avaldsnes IL in the Norwegian Toppserien League.

Early life 
Blomquist was born on August 31, 1993, in Baltimore, Maryland to Joel and Nancy Blomquist.

Blomquist played her high school soccer at Fallston High School, where she was a 4-year varsity starter. As a Senior, she was team captain and named Second Team All-State, First Team All-County, and First Team All-Upper Chesapeake Bay. During her junior season her team won 2A state championship, and during her sophomore season they were 3A State finalist.

Blomquist played her club soccer for Freestate Soccer Alliance- Fury 93 and was a part of Maryland ODP from 2005 to 2009.

Collegiate career 
Blomquist attended University of Louisville her freshman and sophomore year. While there she was named to the Dean's List, received the Red & Black Scholar, and was placed on the Athletic Director's Honor Roll. Then in 2013, Blomquist transferred to the University of Akron. During her two years at Akron, she appeared in 36 matches.

Playing career

Club

Lancaster Inferno, 2014 & 2016 
Blomquist played with the Lancaster Inferno of the UWS in 2014 and 2016.

Columbus Eagles , 2015 
Blomquist played for the Columbus Eagles FC of the WPSL in 2015.

Västerås BK30, 2016 
Blomquist signed a professional contract with Västerås BK30 on August 1, 2016. She scored three goals total: one goal against Örebro SK Söder.

Åland United, 2017 
On January 1, 2017, Blomquist signed with Åland United. In the 2017 season she made 24 appearances. Making 23 starts and playing a total of 2075 minutes.

Sporting Clube De Portugal, 2019

Blomquist signed with Sporting Clube de Portugal in January 2019. She quickly became the starting right back for the Portuguese club.

Detroit City FC, 2020 
On April 9, 2020, Blomquist signed with Detroit City FC for their inaugural women's season. Due to the coronavirus pandemic, the 2020 season was cut short to a 3 match series. She was named MVP for the abbreviated campaign. Blomquist controlled much of the team's attack and was a part of every goal scored.

Ferroviária, 2021

For the 2021 season, Blomquist played for Associação Ferroviária de Esportes in Araraquara, Brazil. The Brazilian club is known for being 2 time Copa Libertadores champions.

Avaldsnes IL, 2022

On December 13, 2021, Avaldsnes announced the signing of the American winger on a 2 year deal. The club is managed by John Arne Riise.

References

External links

1993 births
Living people
Soccer players from Baltimore
People from Bel Air, Maryland
People from Fallston, Maryland
American women's soccer players
Women's association football midfielders
Louisville Cardinals women's soccer players
Akron Zips women's soccer players
Åland United players
Sporting CP (women's football) players
Kansallinen Liiga players
Campeonato Nacional de Futebol Feminino players
American expatriate women's soccer players
American expatriate sportspeople in Sweden
Expatriate women's footballers in Sweden
American expatriate sportspeople in Finland
Expatriate women's footballers in Finland
American expatriate sportspeople in Portugal
Expatriate women's footballers in Portugal
American expatriate sportspeople in Brazil
Expatriate women's footballers in Brazil
American people of Swedish descent